James Joseph Dowd  (1889–1960), was a Major League Baseball pitcher who played for the 1910 Pittsburgh Pirates in one game on July 5, 1910. He pitched two innings and gave up four runs, all unearned. He attended College of the Holy Cross and played in the minor  leagues from 1911 to 1915. He was the grandfather of actress Ann Dowd.

External links

1889 births
1960 deaths
Pittsburgh Pirates players
Baseball players from Massachusetts
Major League Baseball pitchers
Indianapolis Indians players
Utica Utes players
Montreal Royals players